The 12th Emmy Awards, later referred to as the 12th Primetime Emmy Awards, were held on June 20, 1960, to honor the best in television of the year. The ceremony was held at the NBC Studios, in Burbank, California. It was hosted by Fred Astaire. All nominations are listed, with winners in bold and series' networks are in parentheses.

The ceremony's format was a sharp contrast to the previous year's. Several Acting categories were either combined or simply removed, and nearly every category had only three nominees, as opposed to the traditional five or six. Due to the relatively small crop of categories, no show received more than two major awards. The NBC anthology Startime received the most major nominations with five.

Winners and nominees
Winners are listed first, highlighted in boldface, and indicated with a double dagger (‡).

Programs

Acting

Lead performances

Single performances

Directing

Writing

Most major nominations
By network
 CBS – 32
 NBC – 17
 ABC – 3

 By program
 Startime (NBC) – 5
 Father Knows Best (CBS) / The Jack Benny Show (CBS) / The Moon and the Sixpence (NBC) / Playhouse 90 (CBS) – 3

Most major awards
By network
 CBS – 8
 NBC – 4
 ABC – 1

 By program
 The Jack Benny Show (CBS) / The Moon and Sixpence (NBC) – 2

Notes

References

External links
 Emmys.com list of 1960 Nominees & Winners
 

012
Emmy Awards
Primetime Emmy Awards
Primetime Emmy Awards
Primetime Emmy Awards